Harold Matthew Betts (June 19, 1881 – May 22, 1946) was a professional baseball pitcher in the Major Leagues in 1903 for the St. Louis Cardinals and in 1913 for the Cincinnati Reds.

External links

1881 births
1946 deaths
Major League Baseball pitchers
St. Louis Cardinals players
Cincinnati Reds players
Baseball players from Ohio
Newburgh Taylor-mades players
Los Angeles Angels (minor league) players
Oakland Oaks (baseball) players
Jackson Senators players
Yazoo City Zoos players